Power and Market: Government and the Economy is a 1970 book by the economist Murray Rothbard, in which the author analyzes the negative effects of the various kinds of government intervention, and argues that the State is neither necessary nor useful. According to Salerno, it "was originally written as the third volume of Man, Economy, and State, but was published separately eight years later." It was reunited with the 4th edition of Man, Economy, and State in 2004 in the volume sub-titled "The Scholar's Edition" from the Ludwig von Mises Institute.

Summary 
Chapter 1, "Defense Services on the Free Market", argues that economists often overlook the importance of property rights and assume that the free market relies on government-provided defense. However, a truly free market society would have voluntary exchange of justly derived property titles, including defense services. The state derives funds through coercive taxation and arrogates a geographical monopoly. Legal scholars could discover the objective properties of a free legal order, including self-ownership and the homesteading principle. In a free society, protection agencies would sell subscriptions and provide services on call, with judges applying a law code that enshrines the non-aggression axiom. The difference between a libertarian society and one under the state is that the former would not have a systematic legalized method of plunder. The notion of limited government is a contradiction, as it is arbitrary to set limits on government once unbridled property rights are abandoned.

Chapter 2, "Fundamentals of Intervention", discusses types of intervention, including autistic, binary, and triangular intervention. The author also explains the direct effects of intervention on utility, including how any intervention necessarily reduces the utility of the affected subjects, and how democracy is not truly voluntary. Additionally, the author argues that private defense agencies can still maximize utility in a free market, and that the market does not necessarily fail to maximize utility due to envy. The chapter concludes with a discussion on utility ex post, in which the author explains how voluntary exchanges in the market usually benefit individuals, while government policies often fail to achieve their intended objectives.

Chapter 3, "Triangular Intervention", discusses various forms of price control, including maximum and minimum price controls, prohibition, and monopoly grants. Rothbard argues that all of the negative effects associated with free market monopolies also apply to government monopolies and cartels. Examples of government intervention in the market include compulsory cartels, licensing, tariffs, immigration restrictions, child labor laws, conscription, government unemployment benefits, antitrust laws, and conservation laws. The author contends that these interventions harm consumers, distort production, and reduce overall output.

Chapter 4, "Binary Intervention: Taxation", argues that society is made up of taxpayers and tax consumers, and all taxation distorts resource allocation. Tax incidence refers to the actual long-term burden of taxation, and no tax can be shifted forward. Income taxes reduce the utility of taxpayers and provide a disincentive to earn income. Direct taxes on consumption merely translate to an income tax, and a tax on accumulated capital is far more destructive than a tax on income. The only objectively just price is the market price, and it is impossible to tax everyone uniformly.

Chapter 5, "Binary Intervention: Government Expenditures", examines government expenditures and distinguishes between pure transfers and resource-using activities. The first category includes government subsidies, which transfer income from the efficient to the inefficient and distort resource allocation. The second category covers government ownership of resources and socialist policies, which have negative economic consequences. The text argues that government ownership of resources distorts incentives, causes shortages, and limits competition, and that socialism results in the misallocation of resources. Additionally, the text highlights the myth of "public" ownership and the inherent inefficiencies of democracy.

Chapter 6, "Antimarket Ethics: a Praxeological Critique", discusses how praxeology, a value-free science, can demonstrate that certain ethical values are either based on false propositions or conceptually impossible to fulfill. The advocate of laissez-faire does not assume that all people always act in their interest but asserts that everyone should have the right to pursue their interests freely. The market economy is a positive sum game where there is a harmony of interests, and the rise of one person's power over another person is a net loss. It is pointless to argue that human rights should trump property rights because all rights are ultimately property rights.

Chapter 7, "Conclusion: Economics and Public Policy", discusses economics and its uses, as well as the failures of welfare economics, the relationship between economics and social ethics, and the market principle versus the hegemonic principle. Economics provides true laws of cause and effect, but its conditional laws are more useful in public policy debates than for businesspeople. Mainstream economists often make value judgments and design policies to achieve ethical goals, even though they claim to be neutral advisors. Economists can play a role in public policy by ruling out meaningless ethical goals, refuting false objections to the market, and explaining the consequences of government intervention and socialism. The market principle and the hegemonic principle are the only two methods of social relations, and their diffent consequences are discussed.

Publishing history

English
 Power & Market: Government and the Economy. Fourth edition. Auburn, Alabama: The Ludwig von Mises Institute. 2006. .
 Man, Economy & State with Power and Market (The Scholar's Edition). The Ludwig von Mises Institute. 2004. .
 Power and Market: Government and the Economy. New York University Press. 1981 Hardcover. 304 pages.
 Power & Market: Government and the Economy. Kansas City, Missouri: Sheed Andrews and McMeel. 1977.  (paperback).  (cloth).
 Power & Market: Government and the Economy. Menlo Park, California: Institute for Humane Studies. 1970. (hardcover)

Russian
 Power and Market: Government and the Economy. 2002. Hardcover. 402 pages. .

Portuguese
 Governo e Mercado: A economia da intervenção estatal. 2012. .

Notes

External links
 Complete Text
 Full text in HTML format (scroll down past Chapter 12 of Man, Economy, and State)

1970 non-fiction books
American non-fiction books
Books about capitalism
Books by Murray Rothbard
English-language books